Beytullah Hatipoğlu (born 24 February 1992) is a Turkish male volleyball player. He is part of the Turkey men's national volleyball team. On club level he plays for Galatasaray.

Club career
On 25 May 2021, Galatasaray signed a 2-year contract with the successful libero Hatipoğlu.

References

External links
Player profile at Volleybox.net

1992 births
Living people
Turkish men's volleyball players
Galatasaray S.K. (men's volleyball) players
İstanbul Büyükşehir Belediyespor volleyballers
People from Bursa
21st-century Turkish people